Graffiti Research Lab is an art project founded by Evan Roth and James Powderly and run from Eyebeam OpenLab, a non-profit technology and art center where the two are fellows. The two experiment with LEDs, magnets, and conductive paint to augment street art and post instructions on their website. They pioneered "no mess" graffiti using LEDs.

References

External links

American artist groups and collectives
Graffiti in the United States
American websites